Pabellón or Pabellon may refer to:

Places:
Pabellón de Arteaga, city in the Mexican state of Aguascalientes
Pabellón de Arteaga (municipality), municipality in the Mexican state of Aguascalientes
Pabellon Island, the southernmost of two islands in the Melchior Islands, Palmer Archipelago

Food:
Pabellón criollo, traditional Venezuelan dish, the local version of the rice and beans combination found throughout the Caribbean

Sports arenas:
Pabellón Ciudad de Algeciras, arena in Algeciras, Spain
Pabellón Menorca, arena in Menorca in the area of Binitaufa, Mahón, Spain
Pabellón Multiusos Fontes Do Sar, multi-purpose sports arena in Santiago de Compostela, Galicia, Spain
Pabellón Municipal de Deportes La Casilla, 5000-seat arena in Bilbao, Spain, primarily used for basketball
Pabellón Municipal Rafael Florido, arena in Almería, Spain
Pabellón Polideportivo Artaleku, arena in Irun, Spain
Pabellón Polideportivo Ipurua, arena in Eibar, Spain
Pabellón Polideportivo Municipal Fernando Argüelles, arena in Antequera, Spain
Pabellón Polideportivo Pisuerga, arena in Valladolid, Spain
Pabellón Universitario de Navarra, arena in Pamplona, Spain
Pabellon Don Vasco, indoor arena located in Morelia, Michoacán, Mexico
Pabellon Insular Santiago Martin, arena in Santa Cruz de Tenerife, Spain
Pabellon Municipal Fuente San Luis, arena in Valencia, Spain